Kashkul ((), Kashkūl, pronounced: kashkool) also referred to as the beggar's bowl is a container carried by wandering Dervishes (belonging to the Sūfī sect of Islam) and used to collect money and other goods (sweets, gifts, etc.) usually after a street session of poetry recitation, religious eulogies, advice or entertainment.  The container, usually a bowl shaped like a ship, is made out of material such as coco-de-mer shell, clay, metals (usually brass), wood or ceramics and is hung over the shoulder using a metal chain.

Etymology

Kashkūl is a compound word composed of the words konash (کنش) meaning “to make” and kol (کل) meaning “complete” or “full”.  The vowel on the first letter of the first word is changed to “a” instead of “o” and the sound “n” (ن) is removed.  In the second word, the vowel “o” is changed to “ū”.  Together it indicates that all of the Dervish's worldly assets are in the container and therefore asking people to fill it through donations and gifts.

History

The exact dates of the usage of the kashkul containers are not known.  However, there are metal kashkul containers dated to around the 16th Century at the time of the Iranian Safavid dynasty.  There are also references to the crescent shaped kashkuls used to serve wine dated to around the 13th Century.

See also
 Dervish

References

Begging
Containers